The following is an incomplete list of museums in Macau.

List

See also

 Tourism in Macau
 History of Macau
 Culture of Macau
 List of museums

 
Museums
Macau
Museums, Macau

Museums
Museums
Macau